Ženski rokometni klub Z'dežele or simply ŽRK Z'dežele is a women's handball club from Celje, Slovenia. The club competes in the Slovenian First League.

External links
 
 EHF Club profile

Slovenian handball clubs
Sport in Celje